Constantin Virgil Roșu (born 26 May 1990) is a Romanian professional footballer who plays as a right midfielder for FC Bihor Oradea. In his career, Roșu also played for teams such as Luceafărul Oradea, Gloria Bistrița, FC Botoșani or CA Oradea, among others.

Honours
Luceafărul Oradea
Liga III: 2010–11, 2015–16
Liga IV: 2014–15

References

External links
 
 

1990 births
Living people
Sportspeople from Oradea
Romanian footballers
Association football forwards
Liga I players
FC Botoșani players
Liga II players
CS Luceafărul Oradea players
ACF Gloria Bistrița players
Liga III players
CA Oradea players
FC Bihor Oradea (2022) players